The 1947–48 Georgetown Hoyas men's ice hockey season was the 6th season of play for the program but first under the oversight of the NCAA. The Hoyas represented Georgetown University and were coached by Bob Panoff, in his 2nd season.

Season
Georgetown got a rather auspicious jump to the season when they rolled over Lafayette 17–1. While the scoring was spread out over the lineup, Charley Palms and Jim Smith led the way with 5 points each. The following weekend the team took a trip up to Pennsylvania and took a close meeting from Lehigh. They were supposed to play a rematch with Lafayette during the excursion but the Leopards ended up forfeiting the match. Instead, Georgetown returned home and continued their hot start with a second win over the Engineers.

With the team riding high, they headed up to Norwalk, Connecticut, for a two-game series. Unfortunately, the matches only served to show that Georgetown still had a long way to go to be in the same league as the college hockey elites. Afterwards, the team had a long layoff before their next game and they appeared rust in the match against the Baltimore All-Stars. However, Joe Gately stood tall in goal and made 64 saves to lead his team to a victory.

While Georgetown's season wrapped up with the Baltimore win, there were reports that the Hoyas may be invited to participate in an AAU tournament in Buffalo in late March. Unfortunately, no invitation was forthcoming and the Hoyas' season was over.

Roster

Standings

Schedule and results

|-
!colspan=12 style=";" | Regular Season

† Lafayette did not support a varsity program at this time.

Scoring statistics

Note: one goal in the game against Baltimore is not accounted for.

References

Georgetown Hoyas men's ice hockey seasons
Georgetown
Georgetown
Georgetown